European Nation State (in Spanish: Estado Nacional Europeo), also referred to as N, is a small far-right political party in Catalonia, Spain. The party defines itself as "National European" and "Popular Socialist". It publishes Intemperie.

History
The party participated in the 2003 Barcelona municipal elections and the 2004 parliamentary elections. In the latter, the party received 410 votes.

In October 2005 police arrested six N members, including the party general secretary Luis Antonio García Rodríguez. The Fiscalia del Tribunal Superior de Justícia de Catalunya has petitioned that N ought to be banned on the grounds of being a Nazi party.

References

External links
N website

Far-right political parties in Spain
Nationalist parties in Spain
Neo-Nazi political parties in Europe
Neo-Nazism in Spain
Political parties in Catalonia
Spanish nationalism
Far-right politics in Catalonia
Political parties established in 1999
1999 establishments in Spain